The 2017–18 Indiana Hoosiers women's basketball team represents Indiana University Bloomington during the 2017–18 NCAA Division I women's basketball season. The Hoosiers are led by fourth year head coach Teri Moren and play their home games at Simon Skjodt Assembly Hall as a member of the Big Ten Conference. They finished the season of 23–14, 9–7 in Big Ten play to finish in a tie for fourth place. They lost in the quarterfinals of the Big Ten women's tournament to Maryland. They were invited to the Women's National Invitation Tournament where they advanced to the finals and defeated Virginia Tech for the championship.

Roster

Schedule

|-
!colspan=9 style="background:#7D110C; color:white;"| Exhibition

|-
!colspan=9 style="background:#7D110C; color:white;"| Non-conference regular season

|-
!colspan=9 style="background:#7D110C; color:white;"| Big Ten regular Season

|-
!colspan=9 style="background:#7D110C; color:white;"| Big Ten Women's Tournament

|-
!colspan=9 style="background:#7D110C; color:white;"| Women's National Invitation Tournament

Rankings

See also
2017–18 Indiana Hoosiers men's basketball team

References

Indiana Hoosiers women's basketball seasons
Indiana
Indiana Hoosiers
Indiana Hoosiers
Indiana
Women's National Invitation Tournament championship seasons